The J.H. Riekenberg House is a historic residence located in Boone, Iowa, United States.  Born in Schleswig, Germany, Riekenberg emigrated to the United States in 1867, and became a successful businessman and civic leader in Boone.  He had Charles E. Edwins, a local architect, design this house, and local contractor J.J. Thoren built it in 1898.  The 2½-story, frame Queen Anne house features an asymmetrical plan, steeply pitched roof, a wrap-around front porch, a variety of wall surface texture, an octagonal corner tower, and Palladian elements in the gable ends.  The house was listed on the National Register of Historic Places in 1987.

References

Houses completed in 1898
Queen Anne architecture in Iowa
Boone, Iowa
Houses on the National Register of Historic Places in Iowa
National Register of Historic Places in Boone County, Iowa
Houses in Boone County, Iowa